The grey imperial pigeon (Ducula pickeringii) is a species of bird in the family Columbidae. It is found in the Sulu Archipelago, Miangas and Talaud Islands. Its natural habitats are tropical moist lowland forests and plantations. It is threatened by habitat loss.

Description 
eBird describes the bird as "Large pigeon with an elegant, silky appearance. Smooth, pearly gray below with dark gray wings, back, and tail (the first two can appear iridescent greenish in good light). Also note faint white eye-ring. Can be confused with Green Imperial-Pigeon, but Gray is much duller- and darker-winged. An inhabitant of forested offshore islands, where it is typically encountered singly or in pairs up in the canopy. Song is a low, booming “coOOOooouh"

It has been noted feeding on fruits  of figs and Cananga trees.

Habitat and Conservation Status 
Its natural habitats at tropical moist lowland and primary and secondary forest and cultivated areas with trees. Little is known about its movements. It is reportedly resident on some northern Bornean islands, but certainly moves between Philippine islands, and varied in abundance from 1995 to 1997 on Karakelang, Indonesia. Like other small-island specialists, it presumably wanders in search of food.

The IUCN Red List has assessed this bird as vulnerable with the population being estimated at 1,500 to 7,000 mature individuals. Its main threat is habitat destruction through both legal and Illegal logging, conversion into farmland and urban development for tourism. Its large size makes it a target of hunters both for food and as a pet.

It occurs in a few protected areas like the Turtle Islands National Park, Tunku Abdul Rahman National Park, Maratuas and Pulau Mantanani Bird Sanctuary and Rasa Island where it benefits from the protection of the Philippine cockatoo. 

Conservation actions proposed are  survey in suitable habitat in order to calculate density estimates, better understand movements and ecology and calculate remaining habitat to refine the population estimate. Propose sites/islands supporting key populations for establishment as strict protected areas.  Eradicate macaques and black rats from protected islands.Devise and initiate conservation awareness campaigns to control hunting and curb deforestation on key islands. Seek ban on trade in Imperial pigeons. Review taxonomic status of two subspecies (pickeringii and langhornei).

References

External links
BirdLife Species Factsheet.

grey imperial pigeon
Birds of Malesia
grey imperial pigeon
Taxonomy articles created by Polbot